B.B.E. was a French-based trance music act, originally composed of Italian record producers Bruno Sanchioni and Bruno Quartier, and  French producer Emmanuel Top.

Musical career
"Seven Days and One Week" (1996) was a top ten hit in more than ten countries worldwide, reaching number three in the United Kingdom, and in Germany. The song was certified silver by the British Phonographic Industry (BPI) for shipments of 200,000 copies in the United Kingdom.

They had two Top 5 hits in the UK: "Seven Days and One Week" and "Flash". They followed these up with two Top 20 hits: "Desire" and "Deeper Love (Symphonic Paradise)"; and a 1998 album entitled Games.

Later in the band's short career, the trio would move into more ethereal trance productions.

Emmanuel Top managed a record label called Attack Records from 1993 to 2003, and produced many dance hits. More recently, he managed a dance club in Belgium. Bruno Sanchioni co produced one of the first trance recordings, "The Age of Love".

Discography

Studio albums

Singles

References

External links
 

Italian trance music groups
French trance music groups
Positiva Records artists